Rune Hastrup (born 16 October 1991) is a retired Danish footballer.

Youth career
Hastrup went to college on a football college in Randers.

Club career

Hobro IK
Hastrup played his first game for Hobro IK on 20 May 2013 against Skive IK; he was introduced as an 83rd minute substitute.

On 28 June 2015, Hastrup got his contract with Hobro extended. He got his contract extended once again in May 2016.

At the age of only 25, Hastrup announced his retirement from football. He would instead pursue a civilian career as a real estate agent.

Private life
In his spare time, Hastrup plays a lot of poker. According to the website of Hobro IK, Hastrup is fan of Chelsea, and his favourite footballer is Frank Lampard.

Hastrup studied Marketing management.

References

External links
 Rune Hastrup on Soccerway

1991 births
Living people
Danish men's footballers
Association football defenders
Randers FC players
Hobro IK players
Danish Superliga players
People from Randers
Sportspeople from the Central Denmark Region